Jacques Rouland (13 November 1929 – 14 June 2002) was a French radio and television broadcaster.

Biography

In 1964 created and presented the hidden camera show La Caméra invisible where he made practical jokes on unsuspecting members of the public. the show ended in 1970. After the show ended Rouland created another popular French television show called Mardi Cinéma.

Jacques Rouland died on June 14, following a cancer a battle with cancer.

Bibliography
Les Fous rires de la caméra cachée, Paris, Acropolis (ISBN 2-7357-0122-0)
Les Employés du gag « Garder le sourire » « La caméra invisible », Paris, Calmann-Lévy, 1989 (ISBN 270210746X)
Les Sacapoux, Paris, Seine, 1998 (ISBN 2738206875)
Ma caméra invisible, Paris, Pygmalion, 1999 (ISBN 2857046006)
Les Amoureux du 7e art, Paris, Jade, 1985; J'ai lu, 2001 (ISBN 227722300X)

References

1929 births
2002 deaths
People from Manche
Deaths from laryngeal cancer
Deaths from cancer in France
French radio presenters
French male film actors
20th-century French male actors
French television presenters